Dandy Town Hornets F.C. is a professional football club based in Pembroke Parish, Bermuda, that currently competes in the Bermudian Premier Division.

Team colours are brown and gold. The club also has a ladies team and a strong youth section.

History
Founded in 1973, the club fall under auspices of the Western Stars Sports Club and have won the Bermudian league title eight times in their history. Their seventh was in March 2014, with a victory over the Devonshire Cougars, and their eighth was in March 2016 after taking an unassailable lead over nearest challengers Robin Hood with two games to spare.

Achievements
Cingular Wireless Premier Division: 9
 1987–88, 1993–94, 2000–01, 2003–04, 2009–10, 2011–12, 2013–14, 2015–16, 2016–17

Bermuda FA Cup: 3
 1986–87, 2011–12, 2013–14, 2014-15

Bermuda Friendship Trophy: 4
 1990–91, 1993–94, 1994–95, 2002–03

Bermuda Martonmere Cup: 6
 1987–88, 1990–91, 1998–99, 1999–00, 2005–06, 2009–10

Bermuda Dudley Eve Trophy: 5
 1986–87, 1993–94, 2008–09, 2011–12, 2013–14

Bermuda Champions Cup: 1
 2004–05

Bermuda Super Cup: 4
 1993–94, 2000–01, 2005–06, 2011–12

Performance in CONCACAF competitions
CONCACAF Champions' Cup - (North Zone): 1 appearance
Best: Never passed a round

Players

Current squad
 For 2015–2016 season

Notable players

Staff and board members
 President:  Willis Dill
 Vice President:  Shawnette Perott
 Secretary :  Steven Lewis
 Assistant Secretary : Carla Zuill
 Treasurer :  Gershon Gibbons
 Assistant Treasurer :  Christie Morton

Historical list of coaches

 Meshach Wade (September 2008- Dec 2008)
 Scott Morton (December 2008-)
 Jomar Wilkinson (2010–present)

References

External links
 Club page - Bermuda FA

Football clubs in Bermuda
Pembroke Parish